Brian H. Hook (born 1968) is an American lawyer and government official. He served as U.S. Special Representative for Iran and Senior Policy Advisor to Secretary of State Mike Pompeo from September 2018 to August 2020. He previously served as the Director of Policy Planning under Secretary of State Rex Tillerson.

During the George W. Bush administration, Hook served as Assistant Secretary of State for International Organization Affairs; Senior Advisor to the U.S. Ambassador to the United Nations; Special Assistant to the President for Policy in the White House Chief of Staff's office; and as Counsel, Office of Legal Policy, at the U.S. Justice Department.

Hook practiced corporate law at Hogan & Hartson in Washington from 1999 to 2003. He has also worked for Iowa Governor Terry Branstad and U.S. Congressman Jim Leach.

Education
Hook received a bachelor's degree in marketing from the University of St. Thomas in 1990, a master's degree in philosophy from Boston College, and a Juris Doctor degree from the University of Iowa College of Law.

Career
Hook is the founder of Latitude, LLC, an international consulting firm based in Washington, DC. He serves on the advisory board of Beacon Global Strategies.

Hook worked on the 2012 Romney campaign staff as senior advisor on foreign policy. He chaired the foreign policy and national security task forces of the Romney Readiness Project. He was the foreign policy director of Governor Tim Pawlenty's presidential campaign from 2010 to 2011.

In 2013, he co-founded the John Hay Initiative, an anti-isolationist group intended to inform political leaders about foreign policy.

In 2018 Pompeo set up the Iran Action Group to coordinate and run U.S. policy toward Iran with Hook as its head.

Hook serves on the board of trustees for Saint John's Seminary in Boston and the board of directors for the National Civic Art Society in Washington, DC.

In November 2019, Hook was the subject of controversy when an internal State Department report claimed he mishandled an employment issue with department official Sahar Nowrouzzadeh. Nowrouzzadeh had been the subject of a 2017 article in the right-wing Conservative Review which falsely claimed she was born in Iran and made disparaging remarks against her. The article was reportedly passed around the State Department, including to President Trump. Nowrouzzadeh reported the issue to Hook, but the internal report stated he did not take proper action.

On August 6, 2020, Hook announced his resignation from the United States Department of State. Hook was succeeded in the position of Special Representative by Elliott Abrams. He continued to work with Jared Kushner and the White House on the Middle East peace agreements known as the Abraham Accords.

See also
 David Satterfield
 Brett McGurk
 Jim Jeffrey
 Elliott Abrams

References

External links

1968 births
Living people
United States Assistant Secretaries of State
United States Department of Justice officials
University of St. Thomas (Minnesota) alumni
Morrissey College of Arts & Sciences alumni
University of Iowa College of Law alumni
Lawyers from Washington, D.C.
Directors of Policy Planning
George W. Bush administration personnel
Trump administration personnel